The Stierenberg (872 m) is a wooded mountain north of the Alps, located between the cantons of Aargau and Lucerne, with the summit being within the canton of Aargau. The Stierenberg is the highest summit between the valleys of the Suhre and Aabach.

References

External links
Stierenberg on Hikr

Mountains of Switzerland
Mountains of Aargau
Mountains of the canton of Lucerne
Mountains of Switzerland under 1000 metres